Pedro González Alonso (born 21 June 1971), known as Pedro Alonso, is a Spanish actor, writer, and artist. He is best known for his role of Andrés "Berlin" de Fonollosa in the Spanish heist series Money Heist (La casa de papel) and for the role of Diego Murquía in the historical drama series Grand Hotel.

Early life 
Pedro González Alonso was born in Vigo, Spain. He studied at Royal School of Dramatic Arts (RESAD) in Madrid, graduating in 1992, and at Teatro de la Danza (Theatre of Dance). Alonso is ambidextrous and speaks Spanish, Galician, Catalan, and English. He is also a writer and artist, publishing his work under the name Pedro Alonso O'choro.

Career 
He is known for his performances on television in Rías Baixas (2003–2005), Maridos e mulleres (2006–2008), Padre Casares (2008–2015), and Gondar (2009) at a local level in Galicia and nationally for playing characters such as Diego Murquía / Adrián Vera Celande in historical drama Gran Hotel. Alonso played the role of Andrés "Berlin" de Fonollosa in the crime drama series Money Heist (La casa de papel), which aired on Antena 3 in 2017 and currently broadcasts on Netflix. In 2018, he was chosen as "International Star of the Year" by GQ Turkey magazine. He co-starred in Diablo Guardián, Amazon Prime Video’s first drama series in Latin America, which was released in May, 2018. In 2019, Alonso played the leading role in the mystery thriller The Silence of the Marsh.

Personal life 
Alonso is in a relationship with Parisian hypnotherapist and artist Tatiana Djordjevic. He also has a daughter from a previous relationship.

Filmography

Film

Television

Awards and nominations

Bibliography

References

External links
 
 

1971 births
Living people
People from Vigo
20th-century Spanish male actors
21st-century Spanish male actors
Spanish male film actors
Spanish male television actors
21st-century Spanish novelists
Spanish male novelists
21st-century Spanish painters
Spanish male painters
Male actors from Galicia (Spain)
21st-century Spanish male artists